Hulu Langat or Ulu Langat may refer to:
Hulu Langat District
Hulu Langat (federal constituency), represented in the Dewan Rakyat
Ulu Langat (state constituency), formerly represented in the Selangor State Council (1955–59)